"This May Be Me" is the debut single from the singer Kossisko, released on February 17, 2015.

Music video
The video was directed by Adam Tillman-Young, and premiered on The Fader's website on February 17, 2015.

Track listing

References

2015 singles
2015 songs